Theodorus Frelinghuysen II (1724–1761) or Theodorus Frelinghuysen, Jr., was a theologian in Albany, New York. He was a member of the Frelinghuysen Family

Biography
He was the first-born son of Theodorus Jacobus Frelinghuysen and Eva Terhune. He studied at the University of Utrecht and was ordained a minister in October 1745. His first assignment was at the Dutch Reformed Church in Albany, New York. He quickly set sail for America but his ship was captured by the French and he did not reach his new congregation until the following Spring. In January 1756 he married, nineteen-year-old Elizabeth Symes. She was the sister of the wife of John Ogilvie, and they had two daughters together. In October 1759 Frelinghuysen sailed from New York to the Netherlands and died in 1761 at sea while returning from an attempt to raise funds for "Queen's College" (now Rutgers University. His replacement for the church arrived in Albany in October 1760.

References

1724 births
1761 deaths
Reformed Church in America ministers
Theodorus Jacobus
Utrecht University alumni
18th-century American clergy